Kazi Monirul Huda is a politician of Jessore District of Bangladesh, lawyer and former member of Parliament for Jessore-2 constituency.

Career 
Kazi Monirul Huda is a lawyer, BNP central committee member and former general secretary of Jessore district. He was elected to parliament from Jessore-2 as a Bangladesh Nationalist Party candidate in 15 February 1996 Bangladeshi general election.

References 

Living people
Year of birth missing (living people)
People from Jessore District
Bangladesh Nationalist Party politicians
6th Jatiya Sangsad members